Sidney Herbert may refer to:
Sidney Herbert, 1st Baron Herbert of Lea (1810–1861)
Sidney Herbert, 14th Earl of Pembroke (1853–1913)
Sir Sidney Herbert, 1st Baronet (1890–1939)
Sidney Herbert, 16th Earl of Pembroke (1906–1969)